The 1974 Balkans Cup was an edition of the Balkans Cup, a football competition for representative clubs from the Balkan states. It was contested by 6 teams and Akademik Sofia won the trophy.

Group A

Group B

Finals

First leg

Second leg

Akademik Sofia won 2–1 on aggregate.

References

External links 

 RSSSF Archive → Balkans Cup
 
 Mehmet Çelik. "Balkan Cup". Turkish Soccer

1974
1973–74 in European football
1974–75 in European football
1973–74 in Romanian football
1974–75 in Romanian football
1973–74 in Greek football
1974–75 in Greek football
1973–74 in Bulgarian football
1974–75 in Bulgarian football
1973–74 in Turkish football
1974–75 in Turkish football
1973–74 in Yugoslav football
1974–75 in Yugoslav football
1973–74 in Albanian football
1974–75 in Albanian football